"Baby Let's Dance" (stylized as Baby, Let's Dance) is a song by Irish singer-songwriter Shane Filan, released as the promotional single from his debut studio album You and Me (2013) on 4 October 2013. The song was written by Shane Filan, Jon Green and Phil Thornalley.

Music video
A music video to accompany the release of "Baby Let's Dance" was first released onto YouTube on 4 October 2013 at a total length of five minutes and six seconds.

Track listing
Digital download
"Baby, Let's Dance" – 3:15

Chart performance

Release history

References

2013 songs
2013 singles
Shane Filan songs
Songs written by Phil Thornalley
Songs written by Shane Filan
Capitol Records singles